This is a list of newspapers in Mozambique.

List of newspapers

See also
 Media of Mozambique

References

External links
 

Newspapers
newspapers
Mozambique